Dictionnaire biographique du mouvement ouvrier français (DBMOF, "Biographical Dictionary of the French Workers' Movement") is a 44-volume set of biographical dictionaries of the French labor movement compiled by historian Jean Maitron and his successor  between 1967 and 1997.

Bibliography

External links 

 

Biographical dictionaries
French-language books
Books about labor history
Le Maitron